Hemimyzon macroptera is a species of hillstream loach (a ray-finned fish) in the genus Hemimyzon. It is found in clear-water streams with rocky bottom in the Nanpan River basin, Yunnan, China. It is naturally scarce but widespread.

References

Hemimyzon
Endemic fauna of Yunnan
Freshwater fish of China
Fish described in 1982